Violette is a female given name and a surname which may refer to:

Given name
 Violette Cordery (1900–1983), British racing driver
 Violette Huck (born 1988), French tennis player
 Violette Lecoq (1912–2003), French nurse, illustrator and resistance member during World War II
 Violette Leduc (1907–1972), French author
 Violette Morris (1893–1944), French multi-sport athlete, and spy and collaborator for the Germans during World War II
 Violetta Napierska (1890–1968), sometimes spelled Violette, actress in German silent films
 Violette Szabo (1921–1945), British Second World War agent in German-occupied France
 Violette Trépanier (born 1945), politician in Quebec, Canada
 Violette Verdy (1933–2016), French ballerina and director of dance companies
 Violette Wautier (born 1993), Thai singer-songwriter and actress

Surname
 Banks Violette (born 1973), American artist
 Cyndy Violette (born 1959), American poker player
 Dave Violette (born 1963), American curler
 Lorne J. Violette (1884–?), Canadian politician
 Tom Violette (born 1960), American curler

Fictional characters
 Violette Leduc, protagonist of the 2013 biographical drama film Violette 
 Title character of Violette Nozière, a 1978 French crime film
 Violette Honfleur, on the 1980 Peanuts film Bon Voyage, Charlie Brown (And Don't Come Back!!)

See also
 Violetta (given name)
 Violeta (given name)
 Violet (given name)
 Viola (given name)
 Viorica, a female given name
 Le roman de la violette ("The Romance of the Violet"), a medieval poem by Gerbert de Montreuil
 La Violette, comic opera by Michele Carafa, 1828

Feminine given names
French feminine given names
English feminine given names
Given names derived from plants or flowers